Zafaraniyeh Caravanserai (Persian: کاروانسرای زعفرانیه) is a historical caravanserai belonging to Safavid and Qajar era in Zafaraniyeh, Iran.

It was listed in the national heritage sites of Iran with the number 1696 on 8 December 1985.

References 

Tourist attractions in Razavi Khorasan Province
Caravanserais in Iran